The Worumbo Mill was a historic mill on the bank of the Androscoggin River in Lisbon Falls, Maine.  Founded in 1864, it was at one point the community's largest employer.  Its main building, dating to its founding, was destroyed by fire in 1987.  The complex was listed on the National Register of Historic Places in 1973, and was delisted in 2017.

Description
The surviving elements of the Worumbo Mill stand on the northern bank of the Androscoggin River, just south of the center of the village of Lisbon Falls.  Originally a sprawling utilitarian 19th-century building adorned with additions and decorative towers, only two 1920 concrete buildings, one of one story and the other of three, stand today.  Both are set close to Canal Street, adjacent to the dam (now used for hydroelectric generation) that provided power to the mill.

History
The Worumbo Mill began as the brainchild of two residents of Lisbon Falls, Edward Plummer and H.A. Tibbetts.  Later, Oliver Moses, a businessman from Bath was brought in as they sought to build a factory producing fine woolens.  Ground was broken in 1864 and production began in 1865, with Mr. Moses as president of the company.  Operating losses were substantial that first year at $100,000.  This amount is roughly equivalent to $2 million today.  During the 1920s an expansion was added to the mill and is the white building that stands today.  The 1940s saw equipment upgrades.  Due to pressure from overseas clothing manufacturers, the mill announced that it would be closing in 1964 and all 600 employees would lose their jobs.  An attempt to restart production later failed.

A fire started in the original portion of the mill on July 23, 1987, completely destroying the old portion of the complex, but the 1920s expansion was spared from the flames. All told, 283 firefighters responded to the blaze. The Maine Forest Service responded with a helicopter to drop water, and crews from many surrounding towns assisted in the battle. It was one of Maine's largest industrial fires.

The mill was also featured in the Stephen King novel 11/22/63. The mill was demolished in 2016.

See also
Polo cloth  was a trade name for a cloth by the Worumbo Manufacturing Company.
National Register of Historic Places listings in Androscoggin County, Maine

References

Lisbon, Maine
Industrial buildings completed in 1864
Industrial buildings and structures on the National Register of Historic Places in Maine
Textile mills in Maine
Buildings and structures in Androscoggin County, Maine
Economy of Androscoggin County, Maine
National Register of Historic Places in Androscoggin County, Maine
Former National Register of Historic Places in Maine
Demolished buildings and structures in Maine
Buildings and structures demolished in 2016
1864 establishments in Maine
2016 disestablishments in Maine